The Currie Cup is South Africa's premier domestic rugby union competition, played each winter and spring (June to October), featuring teams representing either entire provinces or substantial regions within provinces. Although it is the premier domestic competition, four South African franchises also compete in the United Rugby Championship competition, including for the 'South African Shield'. for the highest placed South African team.

Steeped in history and tradition, the Currie Cup dates back to 1891. The tournament is regarded as the cornerstone of South Africa's rugby heritage, and the coveted gold trophy remains the most prestigious prize in South African domestic rugby.

History

The Currie Cup is one of the oldest rugby competitions, with the first games played in 1889 but it was only in 1892 that it became officially known as the Currie Cup. The competition had its humble beginnings as an inter-province competition in 1884, but when the South African Rugby Board was founded in 1889 it decided to organize a national competition that would involve representative teams from all the major unions. The original participating unions were Western Province, Griqualand West, Transvaal and Eastern Province. The first tournament was held in Kimberley and was won by Western Province. For a prize they received a silver cup donated by the South African Rugby Board, now displayed at the SA Rugby Museum in Cape Town. The story of how the Currie Cup came to be comes from the first overseas rugby team to tour South Africa in 1891, The British Isles, who carried with them a particularly precious bit of cargo. Among the bags, boots and balls was a golden cup given to them by Sir Donald Currie, owner of Union-Castle Lines, the shipping company that transported them to the southern tip of Africa. Sir Donald was clear with his instructions – hand this trophy over to the team in South Africa that gives the best game; and after a spirited display where the unbeaten British Lions narrowly won 3–0, Griqualand West became the first ever holders of the Currie Cup. They then handed the trophy over to the South African rugby board and it became the floating trophy for the Currie Cup competition. The inaugural Currie Cup tournament was thus held in 1892 with Western Province earning the honour of holding it aloft as the first official winners.

The competition missed a few years here and there for reasons such as war and the like, but in 1968 it became a fully fledged annual showpiece.
Western Province dominated the competition's early years, and by 1920 the team from Cape Town had already secured the trophy 10 times. Only Griqualand West could halt the rampant WP side and win the trophy in 1899 and 1911. In 1922 the Transvaal won the competition for the first time, however Western Province would continue to dominate the Currie Cup throughout the 1920s and 1930s, winning the trophy a further 4 times and sharing it twice with Border. In 1939 the trophy returned to Johannesburg for only the second time after Transvaal defeated Western Province in Cape Town. This was the first time WP had lost a final at their home ground Newlands. The Currie Cup went into hiatus during the Second World War but resumed in 1946 when  claimed their first ever trophy by beating Western Province 11–9 in the final at Loftus Versfeld in Pretoria.

At the end of the apartheid 1980s, South African rugby supporters were treated to two of the most memorable Currie Cup finals. In 1989 winger Carel du Plessis scored a last-minute try as WP managed to draw with  16-all, Riaan Gouws missed the conversion which would have given WP its 6th title of the decade a feat which has never been achieved. The following year the Blue Bulls slipped up, though, and Natal sneaked home 18–12, inspired by fly-half Joel Stransky. The 1990s saw further improvement by Natal and the rise of Francois Pienaar's Transvaal. All five of the so-called 'big unions' have won the Currie Cup on at least one occasion in the last 20 years; the Golden Lions (formerly Transvaal) have won the trophy 3 times in 1999, 2011 and 2015; Western Province have won the trophy on six occasions in 1997, 2000, 2001, 2012, 2014, and 2017; the Blue Bulls (formerly Northern Transvaal) have won the trophy 6 times in 1998, 2002, 2003, 2004, 2009 and 2020/21; the Free State Cheetahs have won the trophy 3 times in 2005, 2007 and 2016 and the  have won the trophy 4 times in 2008, 2010, 2013 and 2018. In 2006 the trophy was shared by the Free State Cheetahs and Blue Bulls following their 28-28 all draw in a tense final in Bloemfontein.
Whilst these days the competition lags behind Super Rugby and The Rugby Championship (previously the Tri-Nations) in the order of importance, the Currie Cup still holds a special place amongst South African rugby supporters and players, with the trophy very much still the holy grail of the South African domestic rugby.

Teams
From 1996 to 2015, the following 14 provincial unions participated in the Currie Cup:

Champions and Finals

Between 1892 and 1920, the competition was held as a centralised tournament, with the team with the best record crowned as the winner. Between 1922 and 1936 (as well as in three tournaments between 1957 and 1966), the winner was the team with the best record following a round-robin competition. In all the other seasons, a final was played to determine the champion.

Currie Cup 

In addition to the winners above,  also won the South African Rugby Board Trophy in 1889. This tournament was effectively the precursor to the Currie Cup, which started in 1892.

1 Western Province and Transvaal did not compete.
2 Contested over two seasons.
3 Transvaal were renamed the Gauteng Lions; now known as Golden Lions.
4 Orange Free State were renamed the Free State Cheetahs.
5 Northern Transvaal were renamed the Blue Bulls.
6 Natal were renamed the Sharks.
7 Contested between November and January due to COVID-19 pandemic.
8 Final went to extra-time.

Currie Cup First Division 

1 The 2020 Currie Cup First Division was cancelled due to the COVID-19 pandemic.

Overall winners

Currie Cup Premier Division

 Correct as of 25 June 2022

Since the competition became established as an annual competition in 1968 (see History above).

Currie Cup First Division

Records and statistics
Most career matches

 Most career points
1. 1699 Naas Botha (Northern Transvaal) 1977–1992
2. 1412 Willem de Waal (Leopards/Free State/WP) 2002–2010
3. 1402 Eric Herbert (Northern Free State (Griffons)/Free State) 1986–2001
4. 1210 De Wet Ras (Free State/Natal) 1974–1986
5. 1165 André Joubert (Free State/Natal) 1986–1999
 Most career tries
1. 74 John Daniels (Golden Lions/Boland Cavaliers)
2. 66 Breyton Paulse (Western Province)
3. 65 Chris Badenhorst (Free State)
4. 58 André Joubert (Free State/Natal)
5. 51 Gerrie Germishuys (Free State/Transvaal)
5. 51 Carel du Plessis (Western Province/Transvaal)
5. 51 Niel Burger (Western Province)
5. 51 Jan-Harm Van Wyk (Free State/Pumas)
 Most individual points in a season
1. 268 Johan Heunis (Northern Transvaal) 1989
2. 263 Gavin Lawless (Golden Lions) 1996
3. 252 Casper Steyn (Blue Bulls) 1999
4. 230 Kennedy Tsimba (Cheetahs) 2003
5. 228 Kennedy Tsimba (Cheetahs) 2002
 Most team points in a season
 Sharks (792 in 1996)
 Most individual tries in a season
1. 21 Bjorn Basson (Griquas) 2010
2. 19 Carel du Plessis (Western Province) 1989
2. 19 Colin Lloyd (Leopards) 2006
4. 18 Ettiene Botha (Blue Bulls) 2004
5. 16 Jan-Harm Van Wyk (Free State) 1997
6. 15 Phillip Burger (Cheetahs) 2006
 Most team tries in a season
 Sharks (112 in 1996)
 Most points in match
 Jannie de Beer – 46 v. Northern Free State in 1997
 Most tries in a match
 Jacques Olivier – 7 v SWD in 1996
 Most final appearances
 Burger Geldenhuys 11 (Northern Transvaal—between 1977 and 1989)
 Naas Botha 11 (Northern Transvaal—between 1977 and 1991)

Broadcasting rights

 SuperSport broadcasts live Currie Cup matches in South Africa.
 Sky Sports broadcasts live Currie Cup matches in Ireland and the United Kingdom.
 FloSports airs live Currie Cup matches in the Americas via online streaming.
Nine Network airs Currie Cup matches live in Australia through streaming service Stan. Previously matches were aired on Fox Sports.
 RugbyPass airs live Currie Cup matches via online streaming in certain countries in Asia (Bangladesh, Bhutan, Brunei, Cambodia, China, East Timor, Hong Kong, India, Indonesia, Laos, Macau, Malaysia, Maldives, Myanmar, Nepal, Pakistan, Philippines, Singapore, South Korea, Sri Lanka, Taiwan, Thailand and Vietnam), European Economic Area (Austria, Belgium, Bulgaria, Croatia, Cyprus, Czech Republic, Denmark, Estonia, Finland, Germany, Greece, Hungary, Iceland, Latvia, Liechtenstein, Lithuania, Malta, Netherlands, Noway, Poland, Romania, Slovakia, Slovenia, Sweden), and Eastern Europe (Albania, Armenia, Azerbaijan, Belarus, Bosnia, & Herzegovina, Georgia, Kazakhstan, Kosovo, Macedonia, Moldova, Montenegro, Russia, Serbia, Turkey, Ukraine).
Star+ airs live matches in Latin América, including Brazil.

See also
 Rugby union in South Africa
 Super Rugby
 Super Rugby franchise areas
 Vodacom Cup
 2019 Currie Cup First Division 
 Lion Cup
 Currie Cup / Central Series

References

External links
Currie Cup records (correct to the end of 2006)

SA Rugby - Currie Cup News
Official site

 
Rugby union competitions for provincial teams
1891 establishments in South Africa
Professional sports leagues in South Africa